Jennifer Sadler (born 18 March 1993) is an Australian female volleyball and beach volleyball player. She started playing Volleyball at age 13 and went on to represent Australia as a junior from 2008 to 2011. Sadler currently trains at the Australian Institute of Sport, Centre of Excellence.

In 2015 Sadler was named in the Australian Volleyroos Women's Squad and has participated in all Volleyball World Grand Prix's since.

References

Australian women's volleyball players
Australian women's beach volleyball players
1993 births
Living people
Opposite hitters